James Cook is a Scottish journalist and broadcaster. He is currently Scotland Editor for BBC News and an occasional presenter of the BBC’s Newscast podcast.

Previously, he was Chief News Correspondent on the Nine nightly news programme on the BBC Scotland channel and, before that, Los Angeles Correspondent and Scotland Correspondent for the BBC.

Educated at Forfar Academy, Cook began his career at Radio Tay in Dundee where he first read the news at the age of 15. Since joining BBC Scotland in 1998, Cook has gone on to present many news and current affairs programmes including Good Morning Scotland and Reporting Scotland.

Cook covered the lead up to the 2014 Scottish Independence Referendum for the BBC News Channel and hosted various debates between Yes Scotland and Better Together.

Cook hosted "The Big, Big Debate" at the newly opened SSE Hydro in September 2014 in front of more than 5,000 16- to 17-year-old registered Scottish voters.

References

Living people
Scottish television presenters
Journalists from Glasgow
Year of birth missing (living people)
BBC Scotland newsreaders and journalists
People educated at Forfar Academy